Sir John Dalzell Rankine  (8 June 1907 – 19 February 1987) was a British colonial administrator.

Early life and career 
Rankine studied at Christ's College, in Christchurch, New Zealand, and went on to graduate from Exeter College, Oxford, in 1930. After starting out as a cadet in Uganda in 1931, he became Assistant Secretary to the East African Governor's Conference in 1939 and First Assistant Secretary in 1942.

Senior administrative positions 
Rankine served as Assistant Colonial Secretary of Fiji from 1942 to 1945; during this period he twice acted as Governor in an interim capacity. He subsequently became Colonial Secretary of Barbados from 1945 to 1947, then Chief Secretary of Kenya from 1947 to 1951. During this time he also presided over Kenya's Development and Reconstruction Authority.

Rankine served as Resident of Zanzibar from 1952 to 1954, an office his father, Richard Rankine, had previously held from 1929 to 1937. Officially, the office of Resident in the British Protectorate was equivalent to that of an Ambassador. In reality, it made him a colonial governor in all but name, as the Resident was ex officio vizier to the Sultan of Zanzibar and held all effective power. He went on to become Governor of Western Nigeria from 1954 to 1960, when Nigeria became independent.

Rankine was honoured with the CMG in the 1947 Birthday Honours, KCMG in 1954, Brilliant Star of Zanzibar, 1st Class in 1954, KCVO in 1956, and KStJ in 1958.

|-

|-

|-

References

1907 births
1987 deaths
Governors of Fiji
Resident ministers of Zanzibar
Governors of Western Nigeria
Alumni of Exeter College, Oxford
People educated at Christ's College, Christchurch
New Zealand people of British descent
New Zealand emigrants to the United Kingdom
British Governors and Governors-General of Nigeria
Colonial Secretaries of Barbados
Chief Secretaries of Kenya